The 1977–78 Baylor Bears men's basketball team represented the Baylor University in the 1977–78 NCAA Division I men's basketball season.

Roster

Schedule

|-
!colspan=9 style=| SWC tournament

References 

Baylor Bears men's basketball seasons
Baylor
Baylor Bears basketball team
Baylor Bears basketball team